La Maroma, also known as Tejeda, at an altitude of 2069 m, is the highest peak of the Sierra de Tejeda, Penibaetic System, Spain. The summit is located in the region of Axarquía on the border between the provinces of Granada and Málaga. 

The name La Maroma ("The Rope") comes from a rope used to descend to an ancient ice house located close to the summit. This mountain is in the Sierras of Tejeda, Almijara and Alhama Natural Park.

References

External links

Tejeda (La Maroma), 2.068 m

Mountains of Andalusia
Penibaetic System
Two-thousanders of Spain